Andelat is a commune in the Cantal department in the Auvergne region of south-central France.

Geography
Andelat is located some 4 km north-west of Saint-Flour. It can be accessed by the D679 road which passes through the east of the commune going north from Saint-Flour to Talizat. The D40 road also goes north-west from Saint-Flour passing just south of the village and continuing north-west through the commune to Coltines. The D404 road also comes south from Talizat to intersect the D40 road in the commune then continues south to Roffiac. Andelat village can only be reached by small country roads from the D40 and the D679. There are a number of other villages and hamlets in the commune. These are: Barret, Pagros, Sebeuge, and Le Sailhant. Apart from a number of small forests (the Bois du Sailhant, Bois de Ferval, Les Bessieres) and some scattered areas of trees the commune is entirely farmland.

A railway line passes through the commune from Saint-Flour in the south east and continuing to the north.

The river Ander flows through the commune from west to east just south of the village and continues south-west to join the Truyère near Anglards-de-Saint-Flour. The Ruisseau de la Souche rises in the north of the commune and flows south-west to join Le Babory which flows from the north of the commune. The Ruisseau de Ferval also joins Le Babory further downstream. Le Babory continues south to join the Ander in the commune.

Neighbouring communes and villages

History
Andelat was chosen by King John to be, since 1360, the seat of the Bailiwick of the Auvergne Mountains. He knew the name of the particular jurisdictions and made it subordinate to the Seneschal of Riom. The magistrates found that the village was unworthy of their offices and made it a traveling seat holding hearings in rented rooms at Chaudes-Aigues and Roffiac, and sometimes at the royal castle at Bredon, now in ruins, in the current commune of Albepierre-Bredons. The seat was transferred by François I in 1491 to Murat without reuniting it with its bailiwick and retained its name of Bailiwick of Andelat.

Administration

List of Successive Mayors

Population

Sites and monuments
The waterfall and Sailhant Castle
The Saint Cirgue Church from the 12th, 13th, and 15th centuries

See also
Communes of the Cantal department
Community of Communes of the Planèze website

References

Communes of Cantal